Prusewo  is a village in the administrative district of Gmina Krokowa, within Puck County, Pomeranian Voivodeship, in northern Poland. It is located within the ethnocultural region of Kashubia in the historic region of Pomerania.

The village has a population of 305.

Prusewo was a royal village of the Polish Crown, administratively located in the Puck County in the Pomeranian Voivodeship.

During World War II the Germans operated a labor camp for prisoners of war from the Stalag II-B prisoner-of-war camp in the village.

References

Prusewo